Owshen-e Olya (also Romanized as Owshen-e ‘Olyā; also known as Owshen, Ushan, and Ūshen) is a village in Lay Siyah Rural District, in the Central District of Nain County, Isfahan Province, Iran. At the 2006 census, its population was 124, in 39 families.

References 

Populated places in Nain County